Weeping Woman may refer to:

 La Llorona, a Latin American legend
 La Llorona (2019 film), a Guatemalan film also known as The Weeping Woman
 The Weeping Woman, a 1937 painting by Pablo Picasso
 A Woman Weeping, a 1644 painting by Rembrandt or a student of his
 Weeping Woman and Mask of a Weeping Woman, 1885 sculptures by Auguste Rodin

See also
 La Llorona (disambiguation)
 The Curse of La Llorona, a 2019 American film also known as The Curse of the Weeping Woman